Consolacion, officially the Municipality of Consolacion,  is a 1st class municipality in the province of Cebu, Philippines. According to the 2020 census, it has a population of 148,012 people.

Consolacion is bordered on the north by the town of Liloan, to the west by Cebu City, on the east by the Camotes Sea, and on the south by the city of Mandaue.

Etymology
The town's name came from the name of daughter, Consolacion, of the then Cebu governor when it was re-established as an independent municipality in 1920.

History 
Consolacion was a component barangay first founded in 1871 with a population of 14,248.  Before this, it was only a barrio of the municipality of Mandaue. The barrio, formerly named "Kampi-ig" named after a kind of crab living in mangroves, which was abundant in the area,  became a separate town in 1871. However, in 1902 and 1903, unable to maintain its status as an independent municipality, it reverted to Mandaue.

In 1920, Consolacion was again made an independent municipality after a petition was accepted by the governor. So grateful were the townspeople to the Cebuano governor that they named their new town after his daughter – Consolacion – and they also chose San Narciso as their patron saint, the namesake of the governor's wife, Narcisa.

A year after the construction of the Casa Real or municipal hall, the people built their first church. Because it was made of wood, nipa, and bamboo, it was totally destroyed by a typhoon in 1888. A second one was also destroyed by a typhoon in 1892. A third one was built just before World War II, on its current site.

The present municipal hall is already the third one. The first was destroyed by the typhoon of 1892. The second one was also destroyed, by the Japanese during World War II. Today, Consolacion is a robust residential urban municipality with a vigorous economy, providing a place to live for people employed in the neighboring cities of Mandaue, Lapu-Lapu and Cebu.

Cityhood

On July 6, 2022, House Bill No. 1324 was filed by Reps. Daphne Lagon and Sonny Lagon which seeks to convert the municipality of Consolacion to be known as the City of Consolacion. The bill is currently pending since August 1, 2022.

Geography 

70% of the total area of the town is above or highland mountains and 18% foreshore land.

Barangays 

Consolacion comprises 21 barangays over its :

Climate

Demographics
The population of Consolacion is fast-growing with an intercensal growth rate of 50.45% from 1980 to 1990, repeated and more in subsequent decades.

The demographic distribution profile of Consolacion shows sparsely populated upland barangays, and densely populated lowland barangays within the commercial area along the existing national highway.

Economy

Consolacion's recent economic trend is towards the development of operation of housing/subdivision facilities even with the presence of several medium size manufacturing industries. Consolacion is predicted to become a residential urban municipality in the next 5–10 years.

Infrastructure 

Road Network:
National Road: 
Provincial Road: 
Municipal Road : 
Barangay Road :

Utilities 
Malls: 3
 In June 2012 SM Supermalls opened its second mall in Cebu – SM City Consolacion, located in Lamac.
Public Market: 1
Multi-purpose Building: 1
Recreation Courts/Centers : 22

Education 

Elementary schools: 16
High schools: 10
Vocational: 1
College: 1

Culture

Sarok Festival
The Sarok Festival is celebrated on Consolacion's foundation day. Sarok is a hat made of bamboo strips and dried banana leaves. Sarok Festival a Mardi Gras of colors and street dancing along the main road of Consolacion is celebrated every February 14 in commemoration of Consolacion founding anniversary. The main attraction of this festival is the colorful Sarok and its wide uses.

History
To protect farmers and the folks from the sun and the rain, the sarok, a conical hat made from bamboo strips and dried banana leaves, becomes the needed fad for the people of Consolacion especially that the town is an agricultural land. The festival was traditionally celebrated every February 14 to coincide with its charter day celebrations but this now celebrated in October. However, the Sarok Festival evolved into a free interpretation dance, with the musical concept inspired from the Miligoy de Cebu, a published Filipino folk dance originating from the same place.

Contribution to Cultural Heritage
Consolacion is one of the contributor in Cultural History. It had created a dance called "Miligoy de Cebu". This dance is usually performed by pairs of dancers during social gatherings like baptism, weddings, and special programs in the poblacion. Dancers hold a pair of bamboo castanets in each hand.

Notable personalities

Juan Karlos Labajo - singer and actor
Mark "Honcho" Maglasang - Ex Battalion founder and leader

References

Sources

External links 

 [ Philippine Standard Geographic Code]

Municipalities of Cebu
Municipalities in Metro Cebu